The Loyola Marymount Lions men's basketball team represents Loyola Marymount University in men’s college basketball. The team currently competes in the West Coast Conference. The team has played its home game at Gersten Pavilion since 1981.

Loyola Marymount'’s last appearance in the NCAA Division I men's basketball tournament was in 1990, where they advanced to the Elite Eight. They lost to eventual national champion UNLV. Prior to the NCAA tournament, Lions star player Hank Gathers died during the West Coast Conference men's basketball tournament from a heart condition. The Lions defeated New Mexico State, defending champion Michigan, and Alabama. The 1990 squad was also the highest scoring team in NCAA Division I history with an average of 122 points per game.

History
Loyola Marymount has played in the West Coast Conference since 1955, when the Lions and Pepperdine Waves joined the hitherto Northern Californian league that included Santa Clara University, the University of San Francisco, Saint Mary's College, and the University of Pacific. LMU has played in the WCC ever since, fostering heated rivalries with all WCC members, especially Pepperdine University and the University of San Diego, a WCC member since 1979.

LMU's early basketball history produced two Lions better known for their coaching tenures at other WCC schools than their LMU careers. Pete Newell and Phil Woolpert were classmates at LMU, graduating in 1939. Newell went on to coach the San Francisco Dons to the 1949 NIT title, and the California Golden Bears to the 1959 NCAA tournament championship. Newell is considered one of the most influential coaches in the history of basketball. Woolpert coached the legendary Bill Russell and K.C. Jones led University of San Francisco Dons to NCAA championships in 1954 and 1955.

Though LMU represented the WCC in the 1961 NCAA tournament, the Lions were consistently also rans in the WCC which included powerful University of San Francisco and Santa Clara University teams. Of note from LMU's early WCC teams is Rick Adelman, the 1968 WCC Player of the Year, who enjoyed a 7 year NBA career followed by a 30-year NBA coaching career.

The Lions burst onto the national basketball scene in the late 1980s under coach Paul Westhead. His teams led Division I in scoring in 1988 (110.3 points per game), 1989 (112.5) and 1990 (122.4). LMU's 122.4 point per game in 1990 was still a record as of October 2010. As of October 2010, Loyola Marymount held the five highest combined scoring games in Division I history. Four of the five occurred during Westhead's career, including a record 331 in the 181–150 win over United States International University on January 31, 1989.

Hank Gathers and Bo Kimble transferred to LMU from the University of Southern California. In the 1988–89 season, Gathers became the second player in NCAA Division I history to lead the nation in scoring and rebounding in the same season, averaging 32.7 points and 13.7 rebounds per game. In the 1989–90 season, Kimble led the nation in scoring averaging 35.3 points per game. Both Gathers and Kimble were consensus second team All-American selections in 1990.

In the 1989–90 season, Gathers died after collapsing during the second round of the WCC tournament. The team nevertheless reached the Elite Eight in the 1990 NCAA tournament. Its three postseason wins included a 149–115 regional victory over Michigan that established NCAA men's tournament records for points by one team and combined points in a single game. The Lions ultimately were eliminated by UNLV, a team that went on to win the national championship. Loyola Marymount's final record was 26–6. Gathers (#44) and teammate Bo Kimble (#30) later had their jerseys retired by LMU.

LMU alumnus Mike Dunlap took over the program in 2014 and guided the Lions until the end of the 2020 season. Dunlap was formerly the head coach of the Charlotte Bobcats.

On April 8, 2020, Stan Johnson was announced as the 27th head coach of Loyola Marymount.

Postseason results

NCAA tournament results
The Lions have appeared in the NCAA tournament five times. Their combined record is 5–5.

NIT results
The Lions have appeared in the National Invitation Tournament (NIT) one time. Their record is 1–1.

CIT results
The Lions have appeared in the CollegeInsider.com Postseason Tournament (CIT) two times. Their record is 2–2.

CBI results
The Lions have appeared in the College Basketball Invitational (CBI) one time. Their record is 2–1.

Retired numbers

Loyola Marymount has retired two jersey numbers, both being two members of the 1990 Sweet Sixteen team.

Notes

Lions in professional basketball
The following Lion players have played in the National Basketball Association (NBA):
Rick Adelman
Corey Gaines
Normie Glick
Jerry Grote
Orlando Johnson
Bo Kimble
Forrest McKenzie
Richard Petruška
Keith Smith

The following Lions are playing in international basketball:

Gabe Levin (born 1994), American-Israeli basketball player in the Israeli Basketball Premier League
Eli Scott American basketball player in the Slovak Basketball League

References

External links